SmartTrack is a municipal proposal to enhance GO Transit rail service within Toronto, Ontario, Canada. It takes advantage of the province's existing GO Transit Regional Express Rail plans. SmartTrack has evolved since it was originally proposed by Toronto mayor John Tory as the centrepiece of his 2014 mayoral election campaign.

Originally, SmartTrack was to be a new rapid transit service with 22 stations (of which 14 would be new) along the inner portions of the Kitchener, Lakeshore East and Stouffville GO commuter train corridors. As of 2021, SmartTrack is a proposal to construct five new GO stations along the existing Kitchener, Lakeshore East, Stouffville and Barrie services.

Original proposal
SmartTrack was first proposed during John Tory's 2014 campaign for mayor. It had been changed with proposals made by city staff after Tory assumed office.

It would then run northeast through Scarborough to Unionville in Markham. 22 stations and interchanges with the Union Pearson Express, Line 1 Yonge–University, Line 2 Bloor–Danforth, Line 5 Eglinton, and GO Transit were proposed. Tory estimated ridership would be 200,000 passengers a day, would cost $8billion and be in service by 2022. No costing or ridership studies had been undertaken by Metrolinx, the TTC or the City of Toronto.

On December 5 the executive committee voted unanimously to commence feasibility studies regarding the project with Toronto City Council to vote on it in January. On February 10, 2015, the Toronto City Council voted to spend $1.65million more to study SmartTrack.

SmartTrack is the latest in a series of proposed solutions to provide relief for the overcrowded Yonge–University line, particularly at the Bloor–Yonge station transfer point with the Bloor–Danforth line. As proposed, it would service the shoulder areas of downtown such as Liberty Village, CityPlace, and the proposed East Don Lands development. It would also connect Toronto to major employment centres in Mississauga and Markham. It would run above ground north along Eglinton using the Richview Expressway right of way and along the Kitchener line, Lakeshore East line, and Stouffville line. By building above ground and using existing infrastructure Tory stated that SmartTrack would be built far faster than the Downtown Relief Line (since replaced by the proposed Ontario line), in 7 years opposed to 17.

SmartTrack would complement the Government of Ontario's plan to electrify the entire GO Transit network over the next 10 years to provide regional express rail (RER) to the Greater Toronto and Hamilton Area. Using electric multiple units SmartTrack would provide all day service throughout Toronto approximately every 15 minutes. Tory claims that at Kennedy station a rider would get to Union Station in less than 30 minutes using SmartTrack’s service instead of 40 minutes along TTC's Line 2 and Line 1 subways.

SmartTrack is also the latest proposal to bring rapid transit along Eglinton West to Pearson International Airport after the Eglinton West Subway was cancelled. By connecting to the Eglinton line at Mount Dennis there would be rapid transportation along Eglinton from Pearson International Airport to Kennedy Road.

Tory estimated the cost of SmartTrack to be $8billion, although no detailed studies were undertaken. As proposed by Tory, Toronto's share would be paid for by using tax increment financing. It was expected that the provincial and federal government would each contribute a third of the cost. Mississauga and Markham would also pay their 1/3 share for their portions of the SmartTrack Line, although they made no commitments.

SmartTrack would likely lead to an overhaul of TTC bus routes. Residents of Etobicoke and Scarborough would take an express bus to their closest SmartTrack station instead of the distant terminuses of Line 1 and 2. By diverting these passengers SmartTrack would also benefit North York commuters on the current overcapacity feeder bus routes to the Line 1 subway.

Anticipated economic benefits
There has been an ongoing discussion as to economic benefits of Toronto's different rapid transit choices.
According to Tess Kalinowski, writing in the Toronto Star, a study co-authored by Andre Sorensen, a University of Toronto professor of Human Geography, SmartTrack's route would average 12 hectares per kilometre available for redevelopment. This was slightly more than the 11.1 hectares per kilometre available if the TTC's heavy rail system were extended from Kennedy station to Sheppard Avenue.

Criticism
A controversial part of Tory’s SmartTrack proposal during the election campaign was the Eglinton spur, from Mount Dennis to the Airport Corporate Centre in Mississauga. During the election campaign, Tory promised it would not require tunnelling, then acknowledged under pressure that it might. (Tory and his campaign staff had planned to use the former Richview Expressway corridor to run commuter trains westwards from Mount Dennis. However, that land was no longer available having been sold off for private development. Also the Tory team underestimated the technical difficulties of the large turning circle that heavy rail vehicles would require at Mount Dennis. This forced the need for much more expensive tunnel and elevated sections.) City Manager Pennachetti said the city would study the “technical feasibility, community impacts, and cost implications of a heavy rail line” on the Eglinton spur, including the “feasibility of any required tunnels and bridges.” According to a joint report from city planners and the University of Toronto Transportation Research Institute released in January 2016, heavy rail would draw about 87,000 daily boardings at a cost up to $7.7billion while LRT would draw more than 105,000 daily transit boardings at a cost of about $1.3billion. On January 19, 2016, Mayor John Tory conceded that heavy rail was not the best option for the branch from Mount Dennis to the airport.

The eastern sections of SmartTrack will run on the tracks of the Stouffville GO line, and would therefore be within two kilometres of the proposed extension of the Line 2 Bloor–Danforth subway into Scarborough. There was concern that SmartTrack trains would cannibalize the subway's ridership. A report, titled Choices for Scarborough, Transit, Walking and Intensification in Toronto’s Inner Suburbs written by University of Toronto professors Andre Sorensen and Paul Hess, states that the worst-case scenario would be to build the Scarborough Subway Extension on the city’s approved route along McCowan Road within two kilometres of SmartTrack. By October 2015, TTC CEO Andy Byford also expressed concern that two lines may cannibalize each other’s riders. On January 20, 2016, City Staff issued a proposal to eliminate two of the three stops on the planned Scarborough Subway Extension and to terminate Line 2 Bloor–Danforth at Scarborough Town Centre with no intermediate stops from Kennedy station. Critics claim this revised plan would prevent the subway from cannibalizing ridership from SmartTrack's branch to Markham.

Critics described Tory's pledge to pay the city’s portion of SmartTrack costs solely through tax increment financing as overly risky prompting the city and provincial officials to study the financial risks. In October 2015, a city staff report said TIFs “may be an appropriate revenue tool,” but there is a risk new development won’t happen as expected, and that directly attributing any new development to the transit line may be a challenge. Globe & Mail columnist Marcus Gee cited an example of TIF risk for transit projects: as of 2012, TIF has not been successful in New York City to help pay for a $2.4-billion extension of the 7 subway line, as TIF revenue from new development had fallen more than $100million short of the $283million expected. In October 2016, a City report said that TIF would be insufficient to fund the City's portion of SmartTrack implementation costs. The report said that to "fund the early shortfalls", a 2.1% property tax increase would also be required until 2026.

In October 2015, the mayor's office issued a statement believing a staff report confirms "that SmartTrack will provide real relief on the Yonge subway line with 75 existing TTC bus and streetcar routes connecting into the SmartTrack line.” However, transit blogger Steve Munro countered that the study does not confirm that SmartTrack would relieve crowding on the Yonge-University line as ridership projections were still unavailable to form such a conclusion.

During the 2014 mayoral election, John Tory's election team predicted SmartTrack would carry 200,000 passengers per day with trains operating at a 15-minute frequency with a TTC fare being charged. According to University of Toronto academics, if the service runs every five minutes and uses TTC fares, SmartTrack could carry up to 300,000 people per day. However at a frequency of every 15 minutes (as proposed by John Tory), ridership would fall to about 75,000 people per day with a TTC fare, or half that with a GO fare.

In an October 6, 2015, letter to Toronto's city manager, Metrolinx CEO Bruce McCuaig wrote "Metrolinx and the province believe that the (city report) should reflect the scenario where SmartTrack is an incremental increase in RER (regional express rail) service, rather than an independent and parallel service that co-exists with RER." The letter also says SmartTrack cannot operate as a "surface subway" as federal rail regulations would prohibit TTC-style subway trains from operating on GO's mainline-rail tracks. The letter also warns that SmartTrack could entail "considerable" expense over and above the GO plans for RER, "depending on the service concept and design."

During the 2014 election, John Tory said that SmartTrack could be completed within 7 years. An October 2016 city report suggests that SmartTrack would not be completed until 2024 or 2026, depending on various interpretations.

By late 2017, approval of the new Lawrence East SmartTrack station was in doubt pending a cost/benefit review by the provincial auditor general. There was a concern of political pressure in the decision for this station. There was also the issue of whether the right of way is wide enough to permit construction of the SmartTrack station without shutting down Line 3 Scarborough which also has a station at that location. In January 2021, the Lawrence–Kennedy station was dropped because its proximity to the proposed Scarborough Subway Extension.

Given that the number of proposed new SmartTrack stations had been reduced from 22 to 4 by January 2021, city councillor Gord Perks suggested that SmartTrack be abandoned and that the $1.46billion the City had budgeted for SmartTrack be allocated to improving TTC services.

Revisions to the proposal
By January 2016, City and Metrolinx staff developed a draft proposal to integrate SmartTrack with expanded GO Transit rail service that would make SmartTrack smaller, cheaper and possibly more frequent. The proposal would add $2billion to $3.5billion to existing GO expansion plans.

Under the staff proposal, SmartTrack would be shortened to run from Mount Dennis in the west to Kennedy Subway Station in the east and have only four or five new stations. Staff would replace SmartTrack's western branch along Eglinton Avenue West to Pearson Airport by an expansion of the Eglinton Crosstown LRT. There would be 6-17 LRT stops instead of three SmartTrack stops. SmartTrack's eastern branch from Kennedy Station to Markham would be deferred indefinitely.

SmartTrack was to run trains every 15 minutes. However, ridership modelling showed that such a frequency would not attract a sufficient number of passengers. Thus, staff are looking at frequencies of at least every 10 minutes, and as high as every five minutes during peak periods in some areas - almost as frequent as a subway.

A city staff report presented to Toronto's executive council in March 2016 says that in order to accommodate a “separate and parallel” SmartTrack service, as Tory had promised, would require two additional tracks along the entire length of the existing GO corridor necessitating the demolition of many houses and residential highrise buildings. Also, two new platforms would be required at Union Station. This would not be possible to implement within seven years and for $8billion. Instead of the 22 new stops promised by Tory, staff are proposing only four to eight additional stops. As of March 2016, the issues of fare, frequency of trains and total cost are unresolved.

By June 2016, City planning staff were recommending seven new stations for SmartTrack service in addition to combined SmartTrack/GO RER service at Union Station, one future GO station (Mount Dennis) plus six existing GO stations. A proposed SmartTrack station near Ellesmere SRT station was cancelled. Another proposed station between Liberty Village and Union Station was considered but was rejected as it would not fit with the track density at that location. Staff had estimated that SmartTrack would put 24,100 residents and 19,000 jobs within 500 metres of a station, and would carry 27,600 riders daily in addition to GO Regional Express Rail, and would divert 3,900 riders from the Yonge subway south of Bloor Street during the morning rush hours.

Metrolinx estimated that the six new SmartTrack stations would cost $1.25billion, of which the City would pay $835million, with the federal government paying the balance. Approvals for the financing were still to be secured as of November 3, 2016. Separately, the province was to spend $3.7billion on GO Regional Express Rail which is a prerequisite for SmartTrack. Completion is expected by 2026.

In September 2018, the Ontario Ministry of the Environment approved the environmental assessment for the 6 new SmartTrack stations.

By January 2021, the number of new SmartTrack stations had been further reduced from six to four. The proposed Lawrence–Kennedy and Gerrard–Carlaw stations were dropped due to their proximity to new proposed subway lines, respectively the Scarborough Subway Extension and the Ontario Line.

On August 17, 2021, the province and the City of Toronto signed an agreement in principle to provide five new GO stations to support SmartTrack. One station, Bloor–Lansdowne, is classified as a SmartTrack station even though it will not be on the originally conceived SmartTrack corridor. The new stations will be jointly funded by the City of Toronto, the Province of Ontario and the federal government.

Outstanding issues
As of October 2017, proposed layouts for each new SmartTrack station were available for public review. However, the following issues remained outstanding:
 The projected ridership is not yet known.
 The passenger fare for SmartTrack has yet to be determined and may depend on the outcome of a Metrolinx study on regional fare integration.
 The train frequency is not yet finalized. The hoped-for frequency is 6–10 minutes in rush hours and 15 minutes in the off-hours.
 It is uncertain whether there would be direct trains between the east and west ends of the SmartTrack route, or a change of train at Union Station. A change of trains might reduce ridership.

Current proposal
, the "SmartTrack Stations program" is a plan to construct five new railway stations that will serve existing GO Transit rail lines. Four of the stations (East Harbour, and ) were part of the original SmartTrack proposal while the fifth was not along the SmartTrack corridor. All five stations are expected to open by 2026.

The SmartTrack stations are in addition to four other proposed new GO stations (Park Lawn, Woodbine and Caledonia) that are not part of SmartTrack. Another original SmartTrack station, Mount Dennis, is under construction.

SmartTrack stations
The following table lists SmartTrack stations, both currently proposed and cancelled, along the Kitchener, Lakeshore East and Stouffville GO Transit rail corridors. It excludes Bloor–Lansdowne station on the Barrie corridor as it was not originally conceived as a SmartTrack station.

References

External links
smarttrack.to (archived February 29, 2020)

Transport in Toronto
Transport in the Greater Toronto Area
Proposed public transport in the Greater Toronto Area